The Sinfonia Varsovia is an orchestra and a musical institution based in Warsaw, Poland. It was founded in 1984 by Yehudi Menuhin, Waldemar Dąbrowski and Franciszek Wybrańczyk, as a successor to the Polish Chamber Orchestra. Since 2003 the orchestra has been led by Krzysztof Penderecki as its artistic director.

Menuhin had a close relationship with the orchestra that he helped to found, conducting them in the recording of a full cycle of Schubert's symphonies released in 1998. This followed a cycle of live performances of Beethoven's symphonies in 1994. The cycle was recorded and commercially released. Other conductors to have worked with the orchestra include Claudio Abbado, Charles Dutoit, Jerzy Maksymiuk, Marc Minkowski, Valery Gergiev and Lorin Maazel.

See also
Music of Poland
Warsaw Philharmonic

References

Polish orchestras
Symphony orchestras